Frank Michael Sabo (April 10, 1922 – August 6, 1982) was an American professional basketball player. He played in the National Basketball League for the Detroit Gems. In only three career games he averaged 5.3 points per contest.

Sabo joined the United States Marine Corps in 1942.

Referenced

1922 births
1982 deaths
American men's basketball players
Basketball players from Detroit
Detroit Gems players
Guards (basketball)
United States Marines
United States Marine Corps personnel of World War II
Wayne State Warriors football players
Wayne State Warriors men's basketball players